Hateform is a Finnish band that plays death/thrash metal. The band was founded by Tomy Laisto, Joni Suonenjärvi, and Tuomas Vähämaa in 2004. Soon after Hateform was founded Petri Nyström, the current lead vocalist joined the band. In 2005 Ville Vänni, the lead guitar player of Insomnium joined the band. In 2005 Vänni departed from the band because of his own projects. In 2006 Tom Gardiner, the lead guitar player from Mordred and Scorched Earth Tactics replaced Vänni. The first album of the band, titled Dominance, came out in 2007. In 2008 Hateform won The Year's Beginner Award at Finnish Metal Awards. The latest release is 2013's Sanctuary In Abyss.

Band members

Current
 Petri Nyström - lead vocals
 Tomy Laisto - lead guitar
 Tom Gardiner - guitar
 Joni Suodenjärvi - bass, backing vocals
 Tuomo Latvala - drums

Former
 Ville Vänni - guitar

Discography 
Studio albums
 Dominance (2008)
 Origins of Plague (2010)
 Sanctuary in Abyss (2013)

Demos
 S/T Promo CD 2005 (2005)
 Retaliate (2006)

Singles
 Teuvo, Maanteiden Kuningas (2006)

External links 

 Hateform's official website
 Hateform in MySpace
 Hateform in the Encyclopaedia Metallum

Finnish melodic death metal musical groups
Musical groups established in 2004